Li Guixian (born August 1937) is a retired politician of the People's Republic of China, and a governor of People's Bank of China in 1988–1993. 

Li is a native of Gaizhou, Liaoning Province. He studied at the Chinese University of Science and Technology in 1959–1960. Next, he studied at the Mendeleev Chemical Technology Institute in Moscow starting in 1960, graduating in 1965.

Li joined the Chinese Communist Party in 1962. He became the secretary of the CCP Liaoning Committee in 1985, and secretary of the CCP Anhui Committee in 1986. In 1988–1993, he served as the governor of the People's Bank of China.

References 

1937 births
Living people
People's Republic of China politicians from Liaoning
Governors of the People's Bank of China
Beijing Foreign Studies University alumni
Politicians from Yingkou
Chinese Communist Party politicians from Liaoning
Political office-holders in Anhui
Political office-holders in Liaoning
Businesspeople from Liaoning
D. Mendeleev University of Chemical Technology of Russia alumni
State councillors of China
Vice Chairpersons of the National Committee of the Chinese People's Political Consultative Conference
Chinese expatriates in the Soviet Union